"Delicate" is a song by American singer-songwriter Terence Trent D'Arby featuring English singer Des'ree, released on June 7, 1993 as the third single from his third studio album, Symphony or Damn (1993). It was written, arranged and produced by D'Arby, and peaked at number 14 on the UK Singles Chart.

Critical reception
In an 2018 retrospective review, Patrick Corcoran from Albumism stated that "Delicate" "demonstrated that the delightful soul voice was still ready and primed for action in a song that lived up to its dainty title". Upon the release of the single, Larry Flick from Billboard wrote, "With sweet vocal assistance by Des'ree, D'Arby is poised for his first top 40 hit in years. A tinkly jazz-pop shuffle beat and richly expressive vocals are the basis for an expansive retro-soul tune. Pretty and soothing track should also be of note to adult-geared urban and AC radio formats." In his weekly UK chart commentary, James Masterton said that this is "by far the best track on his new album and destined surely for Top 10 success next week". 

Pan-European magazine Music & Media commented, "Dueting with last year's soul revelation Des'Ree, YID hits radioland completely K.O.. Count to 10, and try to recover after this exquisite ballad." Alan Jones from Music Week gave it four out of five, writing, "An appropriate title for a sweet and soulful duet, this shuffling and summery song is destined for the Top 10." A reviewer from People Magazine noted "the Middle Eastern lounge-jazz filigree" of the song, and added that "his sexy, edgy tenor is a voice that grabs you in all its guises." Sian Pattenden from Smash Hits also gave it four out of five. She felt that D'Arby "has come up with a truly corking pop single. "Delicate" is a soft, ambling tune, as the tender sheen on the pedal of a pansy. It is very smooth and a bit girlie, making sensible people want to snog you." Charles Aaron from Spin viewed it as a "exquisitely gooey single" and "a time-lapse synth-photo of a flower blooming".

Music video

The official music video for the song was directed by British commercial, film and music video director Andy Morahan. It was released on June 7, 1993, and features D'Arby and Des'ree performing the song in a completely white setting. The video was published on Terence Trent D'Arby's official YouTube channel, as Sananda Maitreya, in March 2012. As of December 2022, it had generated more than 4,5 million views.

Track listings
 7"/Cassette
"Delicate" - 4:16
"She's My Baby" - 4:13
"Dance Little Sister" - 3:54

 CD single
"Delicate" – 4:16
"Dance Little Sister" – 3:54

Personnel
Written, arranged and produced by Terence Trent D'Arby 
Mixed by Mark "Spike" Stent
Recorded by Craig Porteils

Charts

Weekly charts

Year-end charts

References

1993 singles
1993 songs
Columbia Records singles
Terence Trent D'Arby songs
Des'ree songs
Music videos directed by Andy Morahan
Male–female vocal duets
Song recordings produced by Terence Trent D'Arby
Songs written by Terence Trent D'Arby